The Lac Fragasso is a freshwater body at the head of a branch leading to the Rocheuse River via Walsh Lake and lac des Alliés, flowing in Jacques-Cartier National Park. This lake is located entirely in the unorganized territory of Lac-Jacques-Cartier, in the La Côte-de-Beaupré Regional County Municipality, administrative region of Capitale-Nationale, in province of Quebec, in Canada.

The watershed of lake Fragasso is mainly served on the east side by the route 175 which connects the cities of Quebec and Saguenay. A secondary road serves the northern part of the lake for the needs of forestry and recreational tourism; while forest road 12 passes south in the area between Lake Fragasso and Lake Walsh.

Forestry is the main economic activity in the sector; recreational tourism, second.

The surface of Lake Fragasso is generally frozen from the beginning of December to the end of March; safe circulation on the ice is generally done from the end of December to the beginning of March.

Geography 
This lake between the mountains resembles a footprint imprinted in the sand.

From there, the current goes up on  towards the north, to join the current coming from the discharge of the Rocheuse River (coming from the north). Then, the current from the latter crosses  to the west of the Lac des Alliés to its mouth.

Toponymy 
This toponym appears on a forest map of 1928. From 1930, this toponym was replaced by the name "Fossambault Lake" whose justification could not be established; consequently, in 1990, the Commission de toponymie du Québec adopted the old designation, now the only official one.

This toponym evokes the life work of Michel Fragasso (1888-1954), originally from Carignola, in the province of Foggia, in Italy. After completing his engineering studies in Liège, the latter immigrated to Quebec in 1912. In addition to having participated in the construction of the Quebec bridge around 1913, this engineer erected several dams, notably those at Jacques-Cartier lakes in the Laurentides Wildlife Reserve, and Sautauriski, located in Jacques-Cartier National Park. Michel Fragasso had married Clara Taché, daughter of the architect Eugène-Étienne Taché, author of the plans for the Parliament of Quebec, the Armory of Quebec as well as the motto of Quebec: "Je me souviens".

The toponym "lac Fragasso" was formalized on October 19, 1990, by the Commission de toponymie du Québec.

Notes and references

See also 
 Jacques-Cartier National Park
 La Côte-de-Beaupré Regional County Municipality
 Lac-Jacques-Cartier, an unorganized territory
 Walsh Lake
 Lac des Alliés
 Rocheuse River
 Rivière du Malin
 Jacques-Cartier River
 List of lakes of Canada

Lakes of Capitale-Nationale
La Côte-de-Beaupré Regional County Municipality